East Pakistan was a Pakistani province established in 1955 by the One Unit Policy, renaming the province as such from East Bengal, which, in modern times, is split between India and Bangladesh. Its land borders were with India and Myanmar, with a coastline on the Bay of Bengal. East Pakistanis were popularly known as "Pakistani Bengalis"; to distinguish this region from India's state West Bengal (which is also known as "Indian Bengal"), East Pakistan was known as "Pakistani Bengal". In 1971, East Pakistan became the newly independent state Bangladesh, which means "country of Bengal" in Bengali.

East Pakistan was renamed from East Bengal by the One Unit Scheme of Pakistani Prime Minister Mohammad Ali of Bogra. The Constitution of Pakistan of 1956 replaced the Pakistani monarchy with an Islamic republic. Bengali politician H. S. Suhrawardy served as the Prime Minister of Pakistan between 1956 and 1957 and a Bengali bureaucrat Iskander Mirza became the first President of Pakistan. The 1958 Pakistani coup d'état brought general Ayub Khan to power. Khan replaced Mirza as president and launched a crackdown against pro-democracy leaders. Khan enacted the Constitution of Pakistan of 1962 which ended universal suffrage. By 1966, Sheikh Mujibur Rahman emerged as the preeminent opposition leader in Pakistan and launched the six-point movement for autonomy and democracy. The 1969 uprising in East Pakistan contributed to Ayub Khan's overthrow. Another general, Yahya Khan, usurped the presidency and enacted martial law. In 1970, Yahya Khan organised Pakistan's first federal general election. The Awami League emerged as the single largest party, followed by the Pakistan Peoples Party. The military junta stalled in accepting the results, leading to civil disobedience, the Bangladesh Liberation War, 1971 Bangladesh genocide and Bihari genocide. East Pakistan seceded with the help of India.

The East Pakistan Provincial Assembly was the legislative body of the territory.

Due to the strategic importance of East Pakistan, the Pakistani union was a member of the Southeast Asia Treaty Organization. The economy of East Pakistan grew at an average of 2.6% between 1960 and 1965. The federal government invested more funds and foreign aid in West Pakistan, even though East Pakistan generated a major share of exports. However, President Ayub Khan did implement significant industrialisation in East Pakistan. The Kaptai Dam was built in 1965. The Eastern Refinery was established in Chittagong. Dacca was declared as the second capital of Pakistan and planned as the home of the national parliament. The government recruited American architect Louis Kahn to design the national assembly complex in Dacca.

Etymology 

Chaudhry Rehmat Ali, who did not include Bengal in the coined word "PAKISTAN", did create a state among many in India in his book Now or Never pamphlet (1933). He called Bengal ‘Bang-e-Islam’ (call to prayer of Islam) and included all of Bengal, West Bengal too. Bengal was a Muslim-majority province. Although he had punned on the word. To Common Pakistanis it was called “Oriental Pakistan” or alternatively Islamically as “Bangalistan”. The word Mashriqi implies as Eastern. Kazim, in his book of reviews, Kal ki Baat (Readings Lahore, 2010), tells us that Aurangzeb’s minister Abul Fazl had opined that Bangla was actually Bangal and that ‘al’ in it meant enclosure. Today, ‘aal’ is taken to mean home, from a sense of ‘outer wall making an enclosure’, which is exactly what Bangla-Desh is today.

History

One Unit and Islamic Republic

In 1955, Prime Minister Mohammad Ali Bogra implemented the One Unit scheme which merged the four western provinces into a single unit called West Pakistan while East Bengal was renamed as East Pakistan.

Pakistan ended its dominion status and adopted a republican constitution in 1956, which proclaimed an Islamic republic. The populist leader H. S. Suhrawardy of East Pakistan was appointed prime minister of Pakistan. As soon as he became the prime minister, Suhrawardy initiated legal work reviving the joint electorate system. There was strong opposition and resentment to the joint electorate system in West Pakistan. The Muslim League had taken the cause to the public and began calling for the implementation of a separate electorate system. In contrast to West Pakistan, the joint electorate was highly popular in East Pakistan. The tug of war with the Muslim League to establish the appropriate electorate caused problems for his government.

The constitutionally obliged National Finance Commission Program (NFC Program) was immediately suspended by Prime Minister Suhrawardy despite the reserves of the four provinces of West Pakistan in 1956. Suhrawardy advocated for the USSR-based Five-Year Plans to centralise the national economy. In this view, East Pakistan's economy would be quickly centralised and all major economic planning would be shifted to West Pakistan.

Efforts leading to centralising the economy were met with great resistance in West Pakistan when the elite monopolist and the business community angrily refused to adhere to his policies. The business community in Karachi began its political struggle to undermine any attempts of financial distribution of the US$10 million ICA aid to the better part of East Pakistan and to set up a consolidated national shipping corporation. In the financial cities of West Pakistan, such as Karachi, Lahore, Quetta, and Peshawar, a series of major labour strikes against the economic policies of Suhrawardy were supported by the elite business community and the private sector.

Furthermore, in order to divert attention from the controversial One Unit Program, Prime Minister Suhrawardy tried to end the crisis by calling a small group of investors to set up small businesses in the country. Despite many initiatives and holding off the NFC Award Program, Suhrawardy's political position and image deteriorated in the four provinces in West Pakistan. Many nationalist leaders and activists of the Muslim League were dismayed by the suspension of the constitutionally obliged NFC Program. His critics and Muslim League leaders observed that with the suspension of the NFC Award Program, Suhrawardy tried to give more financial allocations, aids, grants, and opportunities to East Pakistan than West Pakistan, including West Pakistan's four provinces. During the last days of his Prime ministerial years, Suhrawardy tried to remove the economic disparity between the Eastern and Western wings of the country but to no avail. He also tried unsuccessfully to alleviate the food shortage in the country.

Suhrawardy strengthened relations with the United States by reinforcing Pakistani membership in the Central Treaty Organization and the Southeast Asia Treaty Organization. Suhrawardy also promoted relations with the People’s Republic of China.

His contribution in formulating the 1956 constitution of Pakistan was substantial as he played a vital role in incorporating provisions for civil liberties and universal adult franchise in line with his adherence to the parliamentary form of liberal democracy.

Era of Ayub Khan

In 1958, President Iskandar Mirza enacted martial law as part of a military coup by the Pakistan Army's chief Ayub Khan. Roughly after two weeks, President Mirza's relations with Pakistan Armed Forces deteriorated leading Army Commander General Ayub Khan relieving the president from his presidency and forcefully exiling President Mirza to the United Kingdom. General Ayub Khan justified his actions after appearing on national radio declaring that: "the armed forces and the people demanded a clean break with the past...". Until 1962, the martial law continued while Field Marshal Ayub Khan purged a number of politicians and civil servants from the government and replaced them with military officers. Ayub called his regime a "revolution to clean up the mess of black marketing and corruption". Khan replaced Mirza as president and became the country’s strongman for eleven years. Martial law continued until 1962 when the government of Field Marshal Ayub Khan commissioned a constitutional bench under Chief Justice of Pakistan Muhammad Shahabuddin, composed of ten senior justices, each five from East Pakistan and five from West Pakistan. On 6 May 1961, the commission sent its draft to President Ayub Khan. He thoroughly examined the draft while consulting with his cabinet.

In January 1962, the cabinet finally approved the text of the new constitution, promulgated by President Ayub Khan on 1 March 1962, which came into effect on 8 June 1962. Under the 1962 constitution, Pakistan became a presidential republic. Universal suffrage was abolished in favour of a system dubbed 'Basic Democracy'. Under the system, an electoral college would be responsible for electing the president and national assembly. The 1962 constitution created a gubernatorial system in West and East Pakistan. Each province ran its own separate provincial gubernatorial governments. The constitution defined a division of powers between the central government and the provinces. Fatima Jinnah received strong support in East Pakistan during her failed bid to unseat Ayub Khan in the 1965 presidential election.

Dacca was declared as the second capital of Pakistan in 1962. It was designated as the legislative capital and Louis Kahn was tasked with designing a national assembly complex. Dacca's population increased in the 1960s. Seven natural gas fields were tapped in the province. The petroleum industry developed as the Eastern Refinery was established in the port city of Chittagong.

Six Points

In 1966, Awami League leader Sheikh Mujibur Rahman announced the six-point movement in Lahore. The movement demanded greater provincial autonomy and the restoration of democracy in Pakistan. Rahman was indicted for treason during the Agartala Conspiracy Case after launching the six-point movement. He was released in the 1969 uprising in East Pakistan, which ousted Ayub Khan from the presidency. Below includes the historical six points:-

Final years

Ayub Khan was replaced by general Yahya Khan who became the Chief Martial Law Administrator. Khan organised the 1970 Pakistani general election. The 1970 Bhola cyclone was one of the deadliest natural disasters of the 20th century. The cyclone claimed half a million lives. The disastrous effects of the cyclone caused huge resentment against the federal government. After a decade of military rule, East Pakistan was a hotbed of Bengali nationalism. There were open calls for self-determination.

When the federal general election was held, the Awami League emerged as the single largest party in the Pakistani parliament. The League won 167 out of 169 seats in East Pakistan, thereby crossing the half way mark of 150 in the 300-seat National Assembly of Pakistan. In theory, this gave the League the right to form a government under the Westminster tradition. But the League failed to win a single seat in West Pakistan, where the Pakistan Peoples Party emerged as the single largest party with 81 seats. The military junta stalled the transfer of power and conducted prolonged negotiations with the League. A civil disobedience movement erupted across East Pakistan demanding the convening of parliament. Rahman announced a struggle for independence from Pakistan during a speech on 7 March 1971 and called for a non-cooperation movement from the Bengali populace. Between 7–26 March, East Pakistan was virtually under the popular control of the Awami League. On Pakistan's Republic Day on 23 March 1971, the first flag of Bangladesh was hoisted in many East Pakistani households. Pakistan Army was ordered to immediately launch a crackdown on 26 March whose purpose was to curb the resistance, some of these operations include Operation Searchlight and the 1971 Dhaka University massacre. This led to the Bangladeshi Declaration of Independence.

As the Bangladesh Liberation War and the 1971 Bangladesh genocide continued for nine months, East Pakistani military units like the East Bengal Regiment and the East Pakistan Rifles defected and formed the Bangladesh Forces. The Provisional Government of Bangladesh allied with neighbouring India which intervened in the final two weeks of the war and secured the surrender of Pakistan's eastern command.

Role of the Pakistani military
With Ayub Khan ousted from office in 1969, Commander of the Pakistani Army, General Yahya Khan became the country's second ruling chief martial law administrator. Both Bhutto and Mujib strongly disliked General Khan, but patiently endured him and his government as he had promised to hold an election in 1970. During this time, strong nationalistic sentiments in East Pakistan were perceived by the Pakistani Armed Forces and the central military government. Therefore, Khan and his military government wanted to divert the nationalistic threats and violence against non-East Pakistanis. The Eastern Command was under constant pressure from the Awami League and requested an active-duty officer to control the command under such extreme pressure. The high flag rank officers, junior officers, and many high command officers from Pakistan's Armed Forces were highly cautious about their appointment in East-Pakistan, and the assignment of governing East Pakistan and appointment of an officer was considered highly difficult for the Pakistan High Military Command.

East Pakistan's Armed Forces, under the military administrations of Major-General Muzaffaruddin and Lieutenant-General Sahabzada Yaqub Khan, used an excessive amount of show of military force to curb the uprising in the province. With such action, the situation became highly critical and civil control over the province slipped away from the government. On 24 March, dissatisfied with the performance of his generals, Yahya Khan removed General Muzaffaruddin and General Yaqub Khan from office on 1 September 1969. The appointment of a military administrator was considered quite difficult and challenging with the crisis continually deteriorating. Vice-Admiral Syed Mohammad Ahsan, Commander-in-Chief of the Pakistan Navy, had previously served as political and military adviser of East Pakistan to former President Ayub Khan. Having such a strong background in administration, and being an expert on East Pakistan affairs, General Yahya Khan appointed Vice-Admiral Syed Mohammad Ahsan as Martial Law Administrator, with absolute authority in his command. He was relieved as naval chief and received an extension from the government.

The tense relations between East and West Pakistan reached a climax in 1970 when the Awami League, the largest East Pakistani political party, led by Sheikh Mujibur Rahman, (Mujib), won a landslide victory in the national elections in East Pakistan. The party won 160 of the 162 seats allotted to East Pakistan, and thus a majority of the 300 seats in the Parliament. This gave the Awami League the constitutional right to form a government without forming a coalition with any other party. Khan invited Mujib to Rawalpindi to take the charge of the office, and negotiations took place between the military government and the Awami Party. Bhutto was shocked with the results and threatened his fellow Peoples Party members if they attended the inaugural session at the National Assembly, famously saying he would "break the legs" of any member of his party who dared enter and attend the session. However, fearing East Pakistani separatism, Bhutto demanded Mujib to form a coalition government. After a secret meeting held in Larkana, Mujib agreed to give Bhutto the office of the presidency with Mujib as prime minister. General Yahya Khan and his military government were kept unaware of these developments and under pressure from his own military government, refused to allow Rahman to become the prime minister of Pakistan. This increased agitation for greater autonomy in East Pakistan. The military police arrested Mujib and Bhutto and placed them in Adiala Jail in Rawalpindi. The news spread like a fire in both East and West Pakistan, and the struggle for independence began in East Pakistan.

The senior high command officers in Pakistan Armed Forces, and Zulfikar Ali Bhutto, began to pressure General Yahya Khan to take armed action against Mujib and his party. Bhutto later distanced himself from Yahya Khan after he was arrested by Military Police along with Mujib. Soon after the arrests, a high-level meeting was chaired by Yahya Khan. During the meeting, high commanders of the Pakistan Armed Forces unanimously recommended an armed and violent military action. East Pakistan's Martial Law Administrator Admiral Ahsan, Governor of East Pakistan, and Air Commodore Zafar Masud, Air Officer Commanding of Dacca's only airbase, were the only officers to object to the plans. When it became obvious that military action in East Pakistan was inevitable, Admiral Ahsan resigned from his position as martial law administrator in protest, and immediately flew back to Karachi, West Pakistan. Disheartened and isolated, Admiral Ahsan took early retirement from the Navy and quietly settled in Karachi. Once Operation Searchlight and Operation Barisal commenced, Air Marshal Masud flew to West Pakistan, and unlike Admiral Ahsan, tried to stop the violence in East Pakistan. When he failed in his attempts to meet General Yahya Khan, Masud too resigned from his position as AOC of Dacca airbase and took retirement from Air Force.

Lieutenant-General Sahabzada Yaqub Khan was sent into East Pakistan in an emergency, following a major blow of the resignation of Vice Admiral Ahsan. General Yaqub temporarily assumed the control of the province, he was also made the corps-commander of Eastern Corps. General Yaqub mobilised the entire major forces in East Pakistan.

Sheikh Mujibur Rahman made a declaration of independence at Dacca on 26 March 1971. All major Awami League leaders including elected leaders of the National Assembly and Provincial Assembly fled to neighbouring India and an exile government was formed headed by Mujibur Rahman. While he was in Pakistan Prison, Syed Nazrul Islam was the acting president with Tazuddin Ahmed as the prime minister. The exile government took oath on 17 April 1971 at Mujib Nagar, within East Pakistan territory of Kushtia district, and formally formed the government. Colonel MOG Osmani was appointed the Commander in Chief of Liberation Forces and whole East Pakistan was divided into eleven sectors headed by eleven sector commanders. All sector commanders were Bengali officers who had defected from the Pakistan Army. This started the Bangladesh Liberation War in which the freedom fighters, joined in December 1971 by 400,000 Indian soldiers, faced the Pakistani Armed Forces of 365,000 plus paramilitary and collaborationist forces. An additional approximately 25,000 ill-equipped civilian volunteers and police forces also sided with the Pakistan Armed Forces. Bloody guerrilla warfare ensued in East Pakistan.

The Pakistan Armed Forces were unable to counter such threats. With no intel and low morale, they performed poorly and were inexperienced in guerrilla tactics, Pakistan Armed Forces and their assets were defeated by the Bangladesh Liberation Forces. In April 1971, Lieutenant-General Tikka Khan succeeded General Yaqub Khan as the Corps Commander. General Tikka Khan led the massive violent and massacre campaigns in the region. He is held responsible for killing hundreds of thousands of Bengali people in East Pakistan, mostly civilians and unarmed peoples. For his role, General Tikka Khan gained the title of "Butcher of Bengal". General Khan faced an international reaction against Pakistan, and therefore, General Tikka was removed as Commander of the Eastern front. He installed a civilian administration under Abdul Motaleb Malik on 31 August 1971, which proved to be ineffective. However, during the meeting, with no high officers willing to assume the command of East Pakistan, Lieutenant-General Amir Abdullah Khan Niazi volunteered for the command of East Pakistan. Inexperienced and the large magnitude of this assignment, the government sent Rear-Admiral Mohammad Shariff as Flag Officer Commanding of Eastern Naval Command (Pakistan). Admiral Shariff served as the deputy of General Niazi when doing joint military operations. However, General Niazi proved to be a failure and ineffective ruler. Therefore, General Niazi and Air Commodore Inamul Haque Khan, AOC, PAF Base Dacca, failed to launch any operation in East Pakistan against Indian or its allies. Except for Admiral Shariff who continued to keep pressure on the Indian Navy until the end of the conflict. Admiral Shariff's effective plans made it nearly impossible for the Indian Navy to land its naval forces on the shores of East Pakistan. The Indian Navy was unable to land forces in East Pakistan and the Pakistan Navy was still offering resistance. The Indian Army, entered East Pakistan from all three directions of the province. The Indian Navy then decided to wait near the Bay of Bengal until the Army reached the shore.

The Indian Air Force dismantled the capability of the Pakistan Air Force in East Pakistan. Air Commodore Inamul Haque Khan, Dacca airbase's AOC, failed to offer any serious resistance to the actions of the Indian Air Force. For the most part of the war, the IAF enjoyed complete dominance in the skies over East Pakistan.

On 16 December 1971, the Pakistan Armed Forces surrendered to the joint liberation forces of Mukti Bahini and the Indian army, headed by Lieutenant-General Jagjit Singh Arora, the General Officer Commanding-in-Chief (GOC-in-C) of the Eastern Command of the Indian Army. Lieutenant General AAK Niazi, the last corps commander of Eastern Corps, signed the Instrument of Surrender at about 4:31 pm. Over 93,000 personnel, including Lt. General Niazi and Admiral Shariff, were taken as prisoners of war.

On 16 December 1971, the territory of East Pakistan was handed over to Indian Army under the surrender agreement from West Pakistan and in the Simla Agreement became the newly independent state of Bangladesh. The Eastern Command, civilian institutions, and paramilitary forces were disbanded in the following months.

Geography
In contrast to the desert and rugged mountainous terrain of West Pakistan, East Pakistan featured the world's largest delta, 700 rivers, and tropical hilly jungles.

Administrative geography
East Pakistan inherited 17 districts from British Bengal. 

In 1960, Lower Tippera was renamed Comilla. 

In 1969, two new districts were created with Tangail separated from Mymensingh and Patuakhali from Bakerganj. 

East Pakistan's districts are listed in the following.

Economy

At the time of the Partition of British India, East Bengal had a plantation economy. The Chittagong Tea Auction was established in 1949 as the region was home to the world's largest tea plantations. The East Pakistan Stock Exchange Association was established in 1954. Many wealthy Muslim immigrants from India, Burma, and former British colonies settled in East Pakistan. The Ispahani family, Africawala brothers, and the Adamjee family were pioneers of industrialisation in the region. Many of modern Bangladesh's leading companies were born in the East Pakistan period.

An airline founded in British Bengal, Orient Airways, launched the vital air link between East and West Pakistan with DC-3 aircraft on the Dacca-Calcutta-Delhi-Karachi route. Orient Airways later evolved into Pakistan International Airlines, whose first chairman was the East Pakistan-based industrialist Mirza Ahmad Ispahani.

By the 1950s, East Bengal surpassed West Bengal in having the largest jute industries in the world. The Adamjee Jute Mills was the largest jute processing plant in history and its location in Narayanganj was nicknamed the Dundee of the East. The Adamjees were descendants of Sir Haji Adamjee Dawood, who made his fortune in British Burma.

Natural gas was discovered in the northeastern part of East Pakistan in 1955 by the Burmah Oil Company. Industrial use of natural gas began in 1959. The Shell Oil Company and Pakistan Petroleum tapped 7 gas fields in the 1960s. The industrial seaport city of Chittagong hosted the headquarters of Burmah Eastern and Pakistan National Oil. Iran, an erstwhile leading oil producer, assisted in establishing the Eastern Refinery in Chittagong.

The Comilla Model of the Pakistan Academy for Rural Development (present-day Bangladesh Academy for Rural Development) was conceived by Akhtar Hameed Khan and replicated in many developing countries.

In 1965, Pakistan implemented the Kaptai Dam hydroelectric project in the southeastern part of East Pakistan with American assistance. It was the sole hydroelectric dam in East Pakistan. The project was controversial for displacing over 40,000 indigenous people from the area.

The centrally located metropolis Dacca witnessed significant urban growth.

Economic discrimination and disparity
Although East Pakistan had a larger population, West Pakistan dominated the divided country politically and received more money from the common budget. According to the World Bank, there was much economic discrimination against East Pakistan, including higher government spending on West Pakistan, financial transfers from East to West, and the use of the East's foreign exchange surpluses to finance the West's imports.

The discrimination occurred despite the fact that East Pakistan generated a major share of Pakistan's exports.

The annual rate of growth of the gross domestic product per capita was 4.4% in West Pakistan versus 2.6% in East Pakistan from 1960 to 1965. Bengali politicians pushed for more autonomy, arguing that much of Pakistan's export earnings were generated in East Pakistan from the exportation of Bengali jute and tea. As late as 1960, approximately 70% of Pakistan's export earnings originated in East Pakistan, although this percentage declined as international demand for jute dwindled. By the mid-1960s, East Pakistan was accounting for less than 60% of the nation's export earnings, and by the time Bangladesh gained its independence in 1971, this percentage had dipped below 50%. In 1966, Mujib demanded that separate foreign exchange accounts be kept and that separate trade offices be opened overseas. By the mid-1960s, West Pakistan was benefiting from Ayub's "Decade of Progress" with its successful Green Revolution in wheat and from the expansion of markets for West Pakistani textiles, while East Pakistan's standard of living remained at an abysmally low level. Bengalis were also upset that West Pakistan, the seat of the national government, received more foreign aid.

Economists in East Pakistan argued a "Two Economies Theory" within Pakistan itself, which was founded on the Two-Nation Theory with India. The so-called Two Economies Theory suggested that East and West Pakistan had different economic features which should not be regulated by a federal government in Islamabad.

Demographics and culture

East Pakistan was home to 55% of Pakistan's population. The largest ethnic group of the province were Bengalis, who in turn were the largest ethnic group in Pakistan. Bengali Muslims formed the predominant majority, followed by Bengali Hindus, Bengali Buddhists and Bengali Christians. East Pakistan also had many tribal groups, including the Chakmas, Marmas, Tangchangyas, Garos, Manipuris, Tripuris, Santhals and Bawms. They largely followed the religions of Buddhism, Christianity and Hinduism. East Pakistan was home to immigrant Muslims from across the Indian subcontinent, including West Bengal, Bihar, Sindh, Gujarat, the Northwest Frontier Province, Assam, Orissa, the Punjab and Kerala. A small Armenian and Jewish minority resided in East Pakistan.

The Asiatic Society of Pakistan was founded in Old Dacca by Ahmad Hasan Dani in 1948. The Varendra Research Museum in Rajshahi was an important center of research on the Indus Valley civilization. The Bangla Academy was established in 1954.

Among East Pakistan's newspapers, The Daily Ittefaq was the leading Bengali language title; while Holiday was a leading English title.

At the time of partition, East Bengal had 80 cinemas. The first movie produced in East Pakistan was The Face and the Mask in 1955. Pakistan Television established its second studio in Dacca after Lahore in 1965. Runa Laila was Pakistan's first pop star and became popular in India as well. Shabnam was a leading actress from East Pakistan. Feroza Begum was a leading exponent of Bengali classical Nazrul geeti. Jasimuddin and Abbasuddin Ahmed promoted Bengali folk music. Munier Chowdhury, Syed Mujtaba Ali, Nurul Momen, Sufia Kamal and Shamsur Rahman were among the leading literary figures in East Pakistan. Several East Pakistanis were awarded the Sitara-e-Imtiaz and the Pride of Performance.

Religion

As per the 1951 census, East Pakistan had a population of 44,251,826 people, of which 34,029,654 followed Islam, 9,757,527 people followed Hinduism and 464,644 people followed other religions: Buddhism, Christianity and Animism.

Ethnic and linguistic discrimination
Bengalis were hugely under-represented in Pakistan's bureaucracy and military. In the federal government, only 15% of offices were occupied by East Pakistanis. Only 10% of the military were from East Pakistan. Cultural discrimination also prevailed, causing the eastern wing to forge a distinct political identity. There was a bias against Bengali culture in state media, such as a ban on broadcasts of the works of Nobel laureate Rabindranath Tagore.

Military

Since its unification with Pakistan, the East Pakistan Army had consisted of only one infantry brigade made up of two battalions, the 1st East Bengal Regiment and the 1/14 or 3/8 Punjab Regiment in 1948. These two battalions boasted only five rifle companies between them (an infantry battalion normally had 5 companies). This weak brigade was under the command of Brigadier Ayub Khan (acting Major-General – GOC of 14th Army Division), together with the East Pakistan Rifles, which was tasked with defending East Pakistan during the Indo-Pakistani War of 1947. The PAF, Marines, and the Navy had little presence in the region. Only one PAF combatant squadron, No. 14 Squadron Tail Choppers, was active in East Pakistan. This combatant squadron was commanded by Squadron Leader Parvaiz Mehdi Qureshi, who later became a four-star general. The East Pakistan military personnel were trained in combat diving, demolitions, and guerrilla/anti-guerrilla tactics by the advisers from the Special Service Group (Navy) who were also charged with intelligence data collection and management cycle.

The East Pakistan Navy had only one active-duty combatant destroyer, the PNS Sylhet; one submarine Ghazi (which was repeatedly deployed in the West); four gunboats, inadequate to function in deep water. The joint special operations were managed and undertaken by the Naval Special Service Group (SSG(N)) who was assisted by the army, air force, and marines unit. The entire service, the Marines were deployed in East Pakistan, initially tasked with conducting exercises and combat operations in riverine areas and at the near shoreline. The small directorate of Naval Intelligence (while the headquarters and personnel, facilities, and directions were coordinated by West) had a vital role in directing special and reconnaissance missions, and intelligence gathering also was charged with taking reasonable actions to slow down the Indian threat. The armed forces of East Pakistan also consisted of the paramilitary organisation, the Razakars from the intelligence unit of the ISI's Covert Action Division (CAD).

Governors

Chief ministers

Legacy in Pakistan
The trauma was extremely severe in Pakistan when the news of secession of East Pakistan as Bangladesh arrived – a psychological setback, complete and humiliating defeat that shattered the prestige of the Pakistan Armed Forces. The governor and martial law administrator, Lieutenant-General Amir Abdullah Khan Niazi, was defamed, his image was maligned and he was stripped of his honours. The people of Pakistan could not come to terms with the magnitude of the defeat, and spontaneous demonstrations and mass protests erupted on the streets of major cities in (West) Pakistan. General Yahya Khan surrendered powers to Nurul Amin of the Pakistan Muslim League, the first and last vice-president and prime minister of Pakistan.

Prime Minister Amin invited then-President Zulfikar Ali Bhutto and the Pakistan Peoples Party to take control of Pakistan in a colourful ceremony where Bhutto gave a daring speech to the nation on national television. At the ceremony, Bhutto waved his fist in the air and pledged to his nation to never again allow the surrender of his country like what happened with East Pakistan. He launched and orchestrated the large-scale atomic bomb project in 1972. In memorial of East Pakistan, the East-Pakistan diaspora in Pakistan established the East-Pakistan colony in Karachi, Sindh. In accordance, the East-Pakistani diaspora also composed patriotic tributes to Pakistan after the war; songs such as Sohni Dharti (lit. Beautiful land) and Jeevay, Jeevay Pakistan (lit. long-live, long-live Pakistan), were composed by Bengali singer Shahnaz Rahmatullah in the 1970s and 1980s.

According to William Langewiesche, writing for The Atlantic, "it may seem obvious that the loss of Bangladesh was a blessing"— but it has never been seen that way in Pakistan. In the book "Scoop! Inside Stories from the Partition to the Present", Indian politician Kuldip Nayar opined, "Losing East Pakistan and Bhutto's releasing of Mujib did not mean anything to Pakistan's policy – as if there was no liberation war." Bhutto's policy, and even today, the policy of Pakistan is that "she will continue to fight for the honour and integrity of Pakistan.

See also
 Bangladesh–Pakistan relations
 The Blood telegram
 Indo-Pakistani War of 1971
 List of East Pakistan first-class cricketers
 Partition of India
 Provincial Government of East Pakistan
 West Pakistan

Notes

References

External links
 Government of Bangladesh
 Government of Pakistan

 
East
Former exclaves
Bengal
E
Post-independence history of Pakistan
1950s in East Pakistan
1960s in East Pakistan
1970s in Pakistan
1970s in Bangladesh
Former countries in South Asia
States and territories established in 1955
States and territories disestablished in 1971
1955 establishments in East Pakistan
1955 establishments in Pakistan
1971 disestablishments in Pakistan
1971 disestablishments in Asia
20th century in Bangladesh
Articles containing video clips
Bangladesh–Pakistan relations